The following is a list of notable Scottish Canadians.

List
 H. Montagu Allan (1860–1951), banker, ship owner, sportsman
 Hugh Allan (1810–1882), financier and shipping magnate
 Richard B. Angus (1831-1922), banker and philanthropist
 Alexander Graham Bell (1847–1922), eminent scientist, credited with inventing the first practical telephone
 John Bethune (1751-1815), founded the first Presbyterian Church in Montreal
 Norman Bethune (1890–1939), medical innovator and a hero of the Chinese Revolution
 Bill Blaikie, former Member of Parliament (MP), deputy leader of the New Democratic Party and Deputy Speaker of the House of Commons of Canada
 Daniel Blaikie, Member of Parliament (MP) of the New Democratic Party
 Rebecca Blaikie, former president of the New Democratic Party
 George Brown (1818–1880), founder of the Toronto Globe, Father of Confederation and first de facto leader of the Liberal Party of Canada
 James Cameron, film director and producer
 Douglas Campbell (1922-2009), stage actor
 Gordon Campbell, Premier of British Columbia
 Kim Campbell, first female Prime Minister of Canada
 Neve Campbell, actress (Scottish father)
 John Candy (1950–1994), actor and comedian, father was of Scottish descent
 Wilf Carter (1904-1996), Nova Scotia-born country musician
 Jim Carrey, actor and comedian (his mother is Scottish Canadian from the Gordon Clan))
 James Cockburn (1819-1883), first Speaker of the House in Canada (Conservative Party)
 William Davidson (1740-1790), pioneer settler in New Brunswick
 Stu Davis (1921–2007), singer/songwriter, radio and television performer aka Canada's Cowboy Troubadour (b. David Alexander Stewart)
 John William Dawson (1820–1899), scientist, educator
 Richard Dobie (1731–1805), fur trader, businessman
 Sir James Douglas (1803-1877), chief factor of the HBC's Columbia District (1843–1858) and Governor of the colonies of the Colony of Vancouver Island (1851–64) and the Colony of British Columbia (1858–62)
 Tommy Douglas (1904–1986), Premier of Saskatchewan and first leader of the New Democratic Party
 Shirley Douglas (1934-2000), actress (daughter of Tommy Douglas)
 William Dow (1800–1868), brewer and businessman
 George Alexander Drummond (1829–1910), businessman and senator
 Timothy Eaton (1834-1907), founded Eaton's (Scottish ancestry)
 David Ewart (1841-1921), Chief Dominion Architect
 Sandford Fleming (1827–1915), railway engineer and proponent of standard time zones
 Simon Fraser (1776–1862), Northwest Company trader and explorer
 John Kenneth Galbraith (1908–2006), Ontario, California and Massachusetts academic and economist, U.S. and Canadian diplomat 
 Alexander Tilloch Galt (1817–1893), politician and a Father of Confederation (father was of Scottish ancestry)
 Donald Gordon (1904-1969), Chairman, Wartime Prices and Trade Board, Chairman and President, Canadian National Railways, builder of Churchill Falls
 Ryan Gosling, actor and musician
 Laurie Gough, Canadian-American travel writer
 Hugh Graham (1848–1938), newspaper publisher
 George Monro Grant (1835-1902), President of the Royal Society of Canada
 Iain Hume, Canadian international football (soccer) player
 Michael Ironside, actor and voice actor
 Ted Irvine, ice hockey player
 Chris Jericho, professional wrestler and singer
 Alexander Keith, (1795-1873) brewer (Alexander Keith's Brewery)
 William Lyon Mackenzie King (1874–1950), longest-serving Prime Minister of Canada
 Kaylyn Kyle, Canadian soccer player of Scottish descent
 Avril Lavigne, Canadian singer-songwriter, mother of Scottish descent 
 Grace Annie Lockhart (1855-1916), first woman in the British Empire to graduate from university (May 25, 1875)
 Angus MacAskill (1825-1863), tallest non-pathological person
 J. E. H. MacDonald (1873–1932), painter, member of the Group of Seven
 John MacDonald of Glenaladale (1742-1810), colonist
 John A. Macdonald (1815-1891), first Prime Minister of Canada
 John Sandfield Macdonald (1812-1872), first Premier of Ontario
 Norm Macdonald (1959-2021), stand-up comedian, writer and actor
 Rodney MacDonald, former Premier of Nova Scotia
 William Christopher Macdonald (1831-1917), tobacco manufacturer and philanthropist
 Peter MacKay, Minister of National Defence
 Robert Mackay (1840–1916), businessman and statesman
 Sir Alexander MacKenzie (1764–1820) Northwest Company trader and explorer
 Alexander Mackenzie (1822-1892), second Prime Minister of Canada
 William Lyon Mackenzie (1795-1861), journalist and politician
 Colin Francis MacKinnon (1851-1877), founded St. Francis Xavier College, which grew into St. Francis Xavier University
 Alistair MacLeod (1936-2014), writer, recipient of the Order of Canada
 Kevin S. MacLeod, current Canadian Secretary to the Queen
 David MacNaughton, ambassador and businessman
 Peter MacNeill, actor
 Agnes Macphail (1890-1954), first woman seated into the House of Commons of Canada
 Abraham Martin (1589-1664), St. Lawrence River pilot
 Eric McCormack, award-winning Canadian actor, television producer and writer, best known for his role as Will Truman in the American sitcom Will & Grace
 John McDermott, vocal tenor with Irish roots
 William McDougall (1822-1905), one of the Fathers of Confederation
 Todd McFarlane, comic book writer, filmmaker and entrepreneur
 James McGill (1744–1813), fur trader and merchant
 Peter McGill (1789–1860), businessman and politician
 William McGillivray (1764–1825), fur trader
 Gavin McInnes (born 1970), writer, actor, comedian, commentator, co-founder of Vice Media and Vice Magazine
 Duncan McIntyre (1834–1894), businessman
 Sarah McLachlan, singer-songwriter and musician
 Beverley McLachlin, Chief Justice of Canada
 Norman McLaren (1914–1987), film animation pioneer
 Tara MacLean, singer-songwriter
 Marshall McLuhan (1911–1980), communication and media theorist
 Bobby McMahon, football analyst for Fox Soccer Channel
 Craig McMorris, snowboarding
 Mark McMorris, snowboarding
   Anna Mcnulty, YouTuber
 Simon McTavish (1750–1804), fur trader, sawmill and flour mill operator
 Colin Mochrie, actor and comedian
 Henry Morgan (1819–1893), built the first department store in Canada
 Donald Morrow (1908-1995), Ontario politician, soldier and teacher
 Farley Mowat (1921-2014), author, Scottish ancestry
 Oliver Mowat (1820-1903), third Premier of Ontario
 Alice Munro, Nobel laureate author and short story writer
 George Murdoch (1850-1910), first mayor of Calgary
 James Murray (1721-1794), first civil governor of the Province of Quebec
 Anne Murray, singer and entertainer
 James Naismith (1861-1939), inventor of basketball
 Alexander Walker Ogilvie (1829–1902), miller and statesman
 Roddy Piper (1954–2015), WWE wrestler and actor
 Christopher Plummer (1929-2021), Academy Award-winning actor 
 Francine Racette, actress
 John Redpath (1796–1869), contractor and industrialist
 Peter Redpath (1821–1894), businessman and philanthropist
 Callum Keith Rennie, actor
 John Robertson (1934-2014), sports journalist, covered Expos and Blue Jays, and coined the term "Rider Pride" (son of Scots immigrant) 
 Bernie Shaw, lead singer of rock band Uriah Heep since 1986
 George Simpson (1787–1860), executive and fur trader
 Donald Smith, 1st Baron Strathcona and Mount Royal (1820-1914)
 George Stephen, 1st Baron Mount Stephen (1829-1921)
 Arran Stephens, founder of Nature's Path Foods
 David Stirling (1822–1887), architect; associate architect of the Royal Canadian Academy of Arts
 Daniel Sutherland (1756–1832), businessman and politician
 Donald Sutherland, actor
 Kiefer Sutherland, actor (grandson of NDP leader Tommy Douglas, who was born in Scotland)
 Rossif Sutherland, actor
 Tamara Taylor, actress
 Dave Thomas (born 1949), actor and comedian, Scottish-born mother 
 Ian Thomas (born 1950), singer-songwriter and actor, Scottish-born mother
 William Fraser Tolmie (1812-1886), member of the Legislative Assembly of British Columbia
 Justin Trudeau, 23rd Prime Minister of Canada (his mother, Margaret, is daughter of Scots immigrant Jimmy Sinclair)
 Pierre Trudeau (1919–2000), 15th Prime Minister of Canada (his mother, Grace Elliott, was of Scottish ancestry)
 Tessa Virtue, Olympian ice dancer
 Johnny Reid (born 1974), songwriter and recording artist

See also

 Scottish diaspora
 Scottish placenames in Canada
 Scots-Quebecer
 Anglo-Métis
 English Canadians
 European Canadians
 Scottish people
 Scottish Americans
 Ulster-Scottish Canadians
 Celtic music in Canada
 Glengarry Highland Games

References 

Canada
Scottish

 
Scottish